Mary Camilla Lawson (c.1865 –28 November 1939), born Mary Camilla Macan, later Lady Lawson, was a British Liberal Party politician.

Background

She was born in Bedford as Mary Camilla Macan, fourth daughter of Turner Arthur Macan of Elstow Bedfordshire and Cariff County Armagh. On 28 April 1891, she married Wilfrid Lawson, heir to the Baronetcy of Brayton, Cumberland. They honeymooned in Australia and then resided at Isel Hall, Cumberland. Their marriage did not produce children. She became Lady Lawson in 1906 when her husband succeeded to the Baronetcy.

Political career
For many years she helped her father-in-law, Sir Wilfrid Lawson MP, in his North of England constituency. She did much work for temperance reform and was a member of the British Women's Temperance Association. Lawson was Liberal candidate for the Bedford division of Bedfordshire at the 1922 General Election. She stood as an Asquith Liberal, in opposition to the sitting Liberal MP who was a supporter of the Lloyd George Coalition Government. Her intervention split the Liberal vote and helped the Unionist candidate take the seat. She did not stand for parliament again.

Electoral record

References

1865 births
Liberal Party (UK) parliamentary candidates
1939 deaths
People from Bedfordshire
Wives of baronets